Bavtugay is an urban locality (an urban-type settlement) under the administrative jurisdiction of the Town of Kizilyurt in the Republic of Dagestan, Russia. As of the 2010 Census, its population was 4,765.

History
Urban-type settlement status was granted to Bavtugay in 1992.

Administrative and municipal status
Within the framework of administrative divisions, the urban-type settlement of Bavtugay is in jurisdiction of the Town of Kizilyurt. Within the framework of municipal divisions, Bavtugay is a part of Kizilyurt Urban Okrug.

References

Notes

Sources

Urban-type settlements in the Republic of Dagestan